Zahuatlán may refer to:

Magdalena Zahuatlán
San Simón Zahuatlán